The UK Singles Chart is one of many music charts compiled by the Official Charts Company that calculates the best-selling singles of the week in the United Kingdom. Before 2004, the chart was only based on the sales of physical singles with airplay figures and digital downloads excluded from the official chart. This list shows singles that peaked in the Top 10 of the UK Singles Chart during 2001, as well as singles which peaked in 2000 but were in the top 10 in 2001. The entry date is when the song appeared in the top 10 for the first time (week ending, as published by the Official Charts Company, which is six days after the chart is announced).

Two hundred singles were in the top ten in 2001. Ten singles from 2000 remained in the top 10 for several weeks at the beginning of the year. Seventy-three artists scored multiple entries in the top 10 in 2001. Blue, Daniel Bedingfield, Linkin Park, Nelly Furtado, Sophie Ellis-Bextor and Outkast were among the many artists who achieved their first UK charting top 10 single in 2001.

The 2000 Christmas number-one, "Can We Fix It?" by Bob the Builder (voiced by Neil Morrissey and the theme song from the children's television series), remained at number-one for the first week of 2001. The first new number-one single of the year was "Touch Me" by Rui da Silva. Overall, thirty-one different singles peaked at number-one in 2001, with Atomic Kitten, Blue, Bob the Builder, Robbie Williams, S Club 7, Shaggy and Westlife (all 2) having the most singles hit that position.

Background

Multiple entries
Two hundred singles charted in the top 10 in 2000, with one-hundred and ninety singles reaching their peak this year (including the re-entry "Set You Free" which charted in previous years but reached a peak on its latest chart run).

Seventy-three artists scored multiple entries in the top 10 in 2001. Jennifer Lopez and the three members of Destiny’s Child (Beyonce, Kelly Rowland and Michelle Williams) shared the record for most top 10 hits in 1986 with five hit singles each. Both of these artists totals included a guest spot on the charity single "What's Going On" by Artists Against AIDS Worldwide (also known as All Star Tribute). American girl group Destiny's Child were one of two artists along with Steps to have more than three singles reach the top 10. "Independent Women" and "Survivor" both reached number-one in the UK. "Bootylicious" peaked at number two and "Emotion" landed one place lower at number three. The group were to go on hiatus the following year, with Beyonce and Kelly Rowland both launching solo careers, making this one of their last years together until they reformed.

Jennifer Lopez was the other artist with five top ten entries, including the charity single. "Love Don't Cost a Thing" scaled the chart to reach number one, while "Play" and "Ain't It Funny" reached number three and "I'm Real" ranked at number four.

Steps were one of four acts who had four hit singles in 2001, the best of these both double-A side singles. "Chain Reaction"/"One for Sorrow (Tony Moran US Remix)" and "It's the Way You Make Me Feel" peaked at number two. Of their other singles, "Here and Now / You'll Be Sorry" reached number 4 and "Words are Not Enough"/"I Know Him So Well" took fifth position on the chart.

Bono and The Edge, both from the band U2, also featured on "What's Going On" and recorded three top 10 singles with their band. "Stuck in a Moment You Can't Get Out Of" had the most chart success, peaking at number two in February. "Elevation" reached number three in July and their final hit of the year was "Walk On", making number five in December. Finally, Usher made the top 10 on three occasions in 2001: the American singer took "Pop Ya Collar" to number 2, "U Remind Me" charted one place lower and "U Got It Bad" landed at number five in October.

Dido was one of a number of artists with 3 top-ten entries, including "Stan", "Here with Me" and Thank You". Blue, Mis-Teeq, Samantha Mumba, Robbie Williams and Stereophonics were among the other artists who had multiple top 10 entries in 2001.

Chart debuts
Seventy-five artists achieved their first top 10 single in 2001, either as a lead or featured artist. Of these, eleven went on to record another hit single that year: Alicia Keys, BBMak, D12, Dido DJ Ötzi, Gorillaz, Ian Van Dahl, Lil' Kim, M.O.P., O-Town, So Solid Crew, Sophie Ellis-Bextor and Wheatus. Blue, Eve, Hear'Say, Mis-Teeq and Nelly Furtado all had two other entries in their breakthrough year.

The following table (collapsed) does not include acts who had previously charted as part of a group and secured their first top 10 solo single.

Notes
Dido made her official chart debut this year with "Here with Me", although she provided uncredited vocals on Eminem's 2000 number-one hit "Stan". Sophie Ellis-Bextor was the vocalist on Spiller's 2000 number-one hit "Groovejet (If This Ain't Love)", but was uncredited. "Take Me Home" was her first credited entry in the UK Singles Chart. Darren Hayes had several hit singles as part of Savage Garden in the 1990s, but he appeared on the charity single "What's Going On" as a solo artist. All of The Edge's previous chart success was with his band U2; he featured on "What's Going On" along with Bono. Fred Durst also made his debut independent of Limp Bizkit on this song, as did Chris Martin from Coldplay, Pat Monahan of Train and R.E.M.'s Michael Stipe. Scott Weiland (Stone Temple Pilots) and Perry Farrell (Jane's Addiction) also appeared as solo artists but neither of their groups had previously recorded a top ten single in the UK. T-Boz and Chilli, both from the girl group TLC also made their top 10 debut away from the group with this single. 3LW as a group had one top 10 entry, "No More (Baby I'ma Do Right)", but the three members (Adrienne Bailon, Kiely Williams and Naturi Naughton) all featured on "What's Going On".

Songs from films
Original songs from various films entered the top 10 throughout the year. These included "Inner Smile" (from Bend It Like Beckham), "Lady Marmalade" (Moulin Rouge!), "Out of Reach" and "It's Raining Men" (Bridget Jones' Diary), "There You'll Be" (Pearl Harbor),   "What If" (Christmas Carol: The Movie), "What Would You Do?" (Life) and "Because I Got High" (Jay and Silent Bob Strike Back).

Charity singles
A number of singles recorded for charity reached the top 10 in the charts in 2001. The Comic Relief single was a cover of Billy Joel's "Uptown" by Westlife, peaking at number one on 17 March 2001.

S Club 7 recorded the Children in Need single for 2001, "Have You Ever". It was their fourth number-one single, reaching the top spot on 1 December 2001. Their song "Never Had a Dream Come True" was the Children in Need single the previous year, peaking at number-one, and it remained in the chart for the early part of the year.

A group of artists came together under the banner Artists Against AIDS Worldwide (also known as All Star Tribute) to produce a cover of Marvin Gaye's "What's Going On". This included Christina Aguilera, Backstreet Boys, Britney Spears, Jennifer Lopez, Nelly Furtado and Wyclef Jean. The song reached a high of number six on 17 November 2001.

Best-selling singles
Shaggy had the best-selling single of the year with "It Wasn't Me". The song spent ten weeks in the top 10 and sold 1.15 million copies and was certified 2× platinum by the BPI. "Pure and Simple" by Hear'Say came in second place, selling 1.07 million copies and losing out by around 80,000 sales. Kylie Minogue's "Can't Get You Out of My Head", "Whole Again" from Atomic Kitten and "Hey! Baby" by DJ Ötzi made up the top five. Singles by Westlife, S Club 7, Shaggy featuring Rayvon ("Angel"), Wheatus and Afroman were also in the top ten best-selling singles of the year.

"It Wasn't Me" (4), "Can't Get You Out of My Head" (7) and "Pure and Simple" (9) were all ranked in the top 10 best-selling singles of the decade.

Top-ten singles

Entries by artist

The following table shows artists who achieved two or more top 10 entries in 2001, including singles that reached their peak in 2000. The figures include both main artists and featured artists, while appearances on ensemble charity records are also counted for each artist. The total number of weeks an artist spent in the top ten in 2001 is also shown.

Notes

 "Operation Blade" re-entered the top 10 at number 10 on 6 January 2001 (week ending).
 Released as the official single for Children in Need in 2000.
 Bob the Builder is voiced by Neil Morrissey.
 "Stronger" re-entered the top 10 at number 10 on 6 January 2001 (week ending).
 "Dancing in the Moonlight" originally reached number 19 in February 2000. It was re-released in November 2000.
 Released as the official single for Comic Relief.
 "Don't Stop Movin'" had two separate single-weeks at number one, on 11 May 2001 and 1 June 2001 (week ending).
 "Hide U" was first released in 2000 in double A-side with "Empty Skies", charting at number 73.
 The original version of "Set You Free" was released in 1995 and peaked at number two.
 "Luv Me, Luv Me" failed to chart upon its original release in 1998. Samantha Cole featured on the re-release in place of Janet Jackson.
 "Bohemian Like You" charted at number 42 in 2000 and was re-released in 2001.
 Released as a charity single to benefit AIDS programs.
 Released as the official single for Children in Need.
 "Gotta Get Thru This" spent two weeks at number one in 2001. It returned to the top of the charts on 12 January 2002 (week ending).
 "What If" re-entered the top 10 at number 10 on 5 January 2002 (week ending) for two weeks.
 Figure includes an appearance on the charity single "What's Going On" as part of All Star Tribute.
 Figure includes song that peaked in 2000.
 Figure includes four top 10 hits with the group Destiny's Child.
 Figure includes two top 10 hits with the group U2.
 Figure includes appearance on Eminem's "Stan".
 Figure includes two top 10 hits with the group Limp Bizkit.
 Figure includes two top 10 hits with the group So Solid Crew.
 Figure includes appearance on Oxide & Neutrino's "No Good 4 Me".
 Figure includes a top 10 hit with the group 3LW.
 Figure includes a top 10 hit with the group Backstreet Boys.
 Figure includes a top 10 hit with the group NSYNC.
 Figure includes appearance on Eve's "Let Me Blow Ya Mind".
 Figure includes one top 10 hit with the group R.E.M.

See also
2001 in British music
List of number-one singles from the 2000s (UK)

References
General

Specific

External links
2001 singles chart archive at the Official Charts Company (click on relevant week)

2001 record charts
2001 in British music
2001